Dukinfield is a town in England.

Dukinfield may also refer to:
 Dukinfield (ward), an electoral ward of Tameside, England
 Dukinfield baronets, of Dukinfield, Cheshire

People with the surname
 John Dukinfield (1677–1745), English merchant
 Robert Dukinfield (1619–1689), Parliamentarian commander during the English Civil War

See also
 Dukinfield / Stalybridge (ward), an electoral ward of Tameside, England